Maguindanao's 2nd congressional district was one of the two congressional districts of the Philippines in the province of undivided Maguindanao. It was represented in the House of Representatives from 1987–2022. The district covered 25 interior municipalities of eastern Maguindanao bordering the provinces of Cotabato and Sultan Kudarat, including its capital Buluan. From 2006 to 2008, the district was briefly replaced by the lone district of Maguindanao after a new province was carved out of the 1st district known as Shariff Kabunsuan which was eventually nullified by the Supreme Court. It was last represented in the 19th Congress by Mohamad P. Paglas of the Nacionalista Party.

Representation history

Election results

2022

2019

2016

2013

2010

See also
Legislative districts of Maguindanao
Maguindanao del Sur's at-large congressional district

References

Former congressional districts of the Philippines
Category:Congressional districts of Bangsamoro
1987 establishments in the Philippines
2022 disestablishments in the Philippines
Constituencies established in 1987
Constituencies disestablished in 2006
Constituencies established in 2008
Constituencies disestablished in 2022